The Derby of Budapest is major football rivalry between Ferencvárosi TC and Újpest FC; however, other clubs from Budapest are also included such as Budapest Honvéd FC, Vasas SC, and MTK Budapest FC. Traditionally the Ferencváros - MTK rivalry was the most prestigious fixture but this has since been replaced by Ferencváros - Újpest.

History and rival culture

Ferencváros and Újpest Rivalry 

 
The rivalry between Ferencvárosi TC and Újpest FC is considered one of the most important fixtures in the Hungarian League. No matter what the position of the club is in the championship the stadium is packed. The rivalry started in the 1930s when Újpest won their first Hungarian League title. Since then the two clubs have been competing head to head; however, in the 2000s both clubs were close to bankruptcy which seriously affected their performance in the Hungarian League. Both clubs named their stadium after their iconic figures (Flórián Albert and Ferenc Szusza).

On the day of the match the police have to defend the public from the aggressive supporters of the two clubs. Therefore, the Line 3 of the Budapest Metro is controlled by the police and special carriages are provided before and after the match. The purple-white supporters of the Újpest FC get on at the Újpest-Központ metro station which is the closest metro station to the Szusza Ferenc Stadium. They get off at the Népliget metro station which is next to the Albert Stadion. The journey usually ends up in aggression and vandalism caused by the police and exaggerated by the media.

Ferencváros and MTK Rivalry 

The rivalry between Ferencvárosi TC and MTK Budapest is also one of the most tense fixtures in the Hungarian League. Because the two clubs came from neighbouring districts of Budapest, the tension is even higher. The tension between the two clubs is based on racism. MTK Budapest FC is considered a Jewish club since many Jewish figures appeared in the club between the 1930s and the 1940s while Ferencvárosi TC is associated with far-right politics. Between 1903 and 1929 the two clubs won 24 Hungarian League titles (13 MTK and 11 Ferencváros) out of 24, therefore their match was considered the final of the championship. From the 1930s the two clubs could not maintain their position since other clubs appeared such as Újpest FC in the 1930s (winning five titles) and Csepel in the 1940s (winning four titles). The only non-Budapest team was Nagyváradi AC who won in 1944. Since then the reign of the two clubs was not significant anymore. However, both clubs could win more titles since then. In the early 2000s the two clubs shared the same owner (Gábor Várszegi) which sparked big tension between the two clubs. MTK suffered from antisemitism during World War II. At present MTK have lost their spectators since less than 1000 spectators are present during the football matches, therefore atrocity is scarce.

Ferencváros and Honvéd Rivalry 
The rivalry between Ferencváros and Honvéd dates back to the 1950s when Ferenc Puskás and József Bozsik played for the red and blacks (Honvéd). Honvéd won their first Hungarian League title in 1950. Since then the two clubs are considered rivals. Moreover, the proximity of the two districts is also a cause of tension. The stadium (Bozsik Stadion) of Honvéd is located in the 19th district of Budapest while Ferencváros's stadium Albert Stadion) in the ninth district. The 1950s was ruled by Honvéd winning five Hungarian championship titles. The second revival of Honvéd was in the 1980s when the club won six titles and two in 1990 and 1993 with players like Kálmán Kovács, Lajos Détári, Béla Illés, Gábor Halmai and István Vincze. In the 2000s the matches between the two clubs still ignites a big tension but the number of the spectators decreased.

Titles by club

See also
 Major football rivalries
 Ferencvárosi TC
 Újpest FC
 MTK Budapest FC
 Budapest Honvéd FC

References

External links
 Official Club Website
 Official Club Website
 Official Club Website
 Official Club Website
 Official Club Website

Football derbies in Hungary
Ferencvárosi TC
Újpest FC
Budapest Honvéd FC
MTK Budapest FC
Vasas SC
Sport in Budapest